Abdosetae is a genus of Asian araneomorph spiders in the family Phrurolithidae, first described by J. Y. Fu, F. Zhang & J. MacDermott in 2010.

Species
 it contains five species:
Abdosetae digitata Jin, Fu & Zhang, 2015 – China
Abdosetae falcata Jin, Fu & Zhang, 2015 – China
Abdosetae hainan Fu, Zhang & MacDermott, 2010 (type) – China
Abdosetae hamata Jin, Fu & Zhang, 2015 – China
Abdosetae ornata (Deeleman-Reinhold, 2001) – Borneo

References

Araneomorphae genera
Phrurolithidae